Aldo Rossano Graziati (January 5, 1905 in Scorzè, Italy - November 14, 1953 in Pianiga, Italy) was an Italian cinematographer.

Biography 
Known also as G. R. Aldo (Graziati Rossano Aldo, his full name written in reverse) or Aldò (to the French, as he worked many years in Paris), he distinguished himself with his refined technique and unique tonal sensitivity, especially with the lighting effects characteristic of the black and white of neorealism.

He moved to France in 1923, where he worked many years as choreographer, scenic photographer and operator. During the German occupation he moved to Nizza, where he met Michelangelo Antonioni whom invited him to return to Italy.

In 1946 he went for an interview by Luchino Visconti. Two years later, he entrusted him with the role of cinematographer for his film, "La terra trema".

He died prematurely between Padoa and Venice due to an automobile accident. He was producing the film Senso, his first and only film in colour, at the time. The community theatre in Scorzé, his birthplace, was named after him in commemoration.

Filmography
 1954 - Senso
 1954 - Via Padova 46
 1953 - Station Terminus
 1953 - La Provinciale
 1952 - Tre storie proibite
 1952 - Umberto D.
 1951 - Othello
 1951 - Miracle in Milan
 1951 - Tomorrow Is Another Day
 1950 - Domani è troppo tardi
 1950 - Gli ultimi giorni di Pompei
 1949 - Heaven over the Marshes
 1948 - The Earth Will Tremble
 1948 - La Chartreuse de Parme
 1947 - Couleur de Venise

Awards
Won 1955 Italian National Syndicate of Film Journalists for Best Cinematography - (Senso)
Won 1950 Italian National Syndicate of Film Journalists for Best Cinematography - (Heaven Over the Marshes and Gli ultimi giorni di Pompei)

External links

References

1905 births
1953 deaths
Film people from the Metropolitan City of Venice
Italian cinematographers